Chatfield Township is one of the sixteen townships of Crawford County, Ohio, United States. As of the 2010 census there were 724 people living in the township, 535 of whom were in the unincorporated portions.

Geography
Located in the northern part of the county, it borders the following townships:
Venice Township, Seneca County - north
Cranberry Township - east
Liberty Township - south
Holmes Township - southwest
Lykens Township - west
Bloom Township, Seneca County - northwest

The village of Chatfield is located in the center of Chatfield Township.

Name and history
Chatfield Township was likely named for Silas and Oliver Chatfield, pioneer settlers.

It is the only Chatfield Township statewide.

Government
The township is governed by a three-member board of trustees, who are elected in November of odd-numbered years to a four-year term beginning on the following January 1. Two are elected in the year after the presidential election and one is elected in the year before it. There is also an elected township fiscal officer, who serves a four-year term beginning on April 1 of the year after the election, which is held in November of the year before the presidential election. Vacancies in the fiscal officership or on the board of trustees are filled by the remaining trustees.

References

External links
County website

Townships in Crawford County, Ohio
Townships in Ohio